Victor Teleucă (19 January 1933 – 12 August 2002) was a Moldovan writer and poet from Bessarabia (now Republic of Moldova). He was the first editor in chief of Literatura și Arta (1977–1983).

Works 
Momentul inimii, Chișinău, "Cartea Moldovei", 1975
Încercarea de a nu muri, Chișinău, "Literatura artistică", 1980
Întoarcerea dramaticului eu, Chișinău, "Literatura artistică", 1983
Piramida Singurătății, Chișinău, "Cartea Moldovei", 2000
Ninge la o margine de existență, Chișinău, "Cartea Moldovei", 2002
Decebal, Chișinău, "Universul", 2002
Momentul inimii, Chișinău, Litera, 2003
Improvizația nisipului, Chișinău, "Universul", 2006

Bibliography
Theodor Codreanu, Transmodernismul, Iași, "Junimea", 2005, pag. 245–257.

References

1933 births
Romanian people of Moldovan descent
2002 deaths
People from Edineț District
Moldovan journalists
Male journalists
Romanian writers
Recipients of the Order of the Republic (Moldova)
20th-century journalists